2014 Southeast Asian Floorball Championships is the inaugural edition of the Southeast Asian Floorball Championships hosted at the Hougang Sports Complex in Singapore from 18–21 December 2014. Four nations participated at the tournament with Indonesia and the Philippines making their international debut in both men's and women's floorball.

Results

Men's

Preliminary round

Third place playoff

Final

Women's

Preliminary round

Third place playoff

Final

References

Floorball Southeast Asian Championships
Southeast Asian Championships